Saxifraga burseriana, called the early white-flowered saxifrage, is a species of flowering plant in the genus Saxifraga, native to the eastern Alps; Germany, Austria, Liechtenstein, Italy, and Slovenia. Its cultivar 'Crenata' has gained the Royal Horticultural Society's Award of Garden Merit.

References

burseriana
Flora of Austria
Flora of Germany
Flora of Italy
Flora of Slovenia
Taxa named by Carl Linnaeus
Plants described in 1753